Traditional Korean musical instruments comprise a wide range of string, wind, and percussion instruments. Many traditional Korean musical instruments (especially those used in Confucian ceremonies) derive from Chinese musical instruments.

String
Korean string instruments include those that are plucked, bowed, and struck. Most Korean string instruments use silk strings, except as noted.

Plucked

Zithers 
 Gayageum (hangul: 가야금; hanja: 伽倻琴) – A long zither with 12 strings; modern versions may have 13, 15, 17, 18, 21, 22, or 25 strings
 Geomungo (hangul: 거문고) – A fretted bass zither with six to eleven silk strings that is plucked with a bamboo stick and played with a weight made out of cloth
Cheolhyeongeum (hangul: 철현금; hanja: 鐵絃琴) – A geomungo with 8 steel strings plucked with a bamboo stick and played with a slide made out of either glass or metal in the manner of a slide guitar, developed in the 20th centuryphoto 1photo 2
 Daejaeng (hangul: 대쟁; hanja: 大筝) – A long zither with 15 strings, slightly larger than the gayageum; it was used during the Goryeo period but is no longer usedphoto
 Seul (hangul: 슬; hanja: 瑟) – A long zither with 25 strings, derived from the Chinese se; used today only in Munmyo jeryeak (Korean Confucian ritual music)photo
 Geum (hangul: 금; hanja: 琴) – A 7-stringed zither, derived from the Chinese guqin; also called chilheyongeum; used today only in Munmyo jeryeak (Korean Confucian ritual music)photo
Ongnyugeum (hangul: 옥류금; hanja: 玉流琴) – A large modernized box zither with 33 nylon-wrapped metal strings, developed in 1973; used only in North Korea (pronounced ongryugeum in North Korea)photo 1photo 2photo 3

Harps 

 Gonghu (hangul: 공후; hanja: 箜篌) – Harps (no longer used).  There were four subtypes according to shape:
 Sogonghu (hangul: 소공후; hanja: 小箜篌; literally "small harp") – harp with angled sound box, 13 strings, and a peg that is tucked into the player's beltphoto
 Sugonghu (hangul: 수공후; hanja: 豎箜篌; literally "vertical harp") – vertical harp without sound box and 21 strings photo
 Wagonghu (hangul: 와공후; hanja: 臥箜篌; literally "lying down harp") – Arched harp with a large internal sound box and 13 strings, similar to Burmese saung gauk photo
 Daegonghu (hangul: 대공후; hanja: 大箜篌) – large vertical harp with 23-strings

Lutes 

 Bipa (hangul: 비파; hanja: 琵琶) – A pear-shaped lute with five strings (hyangbipa or jikgyeongbipa) or five strings (dangbipa). Uncommon today; most modern recreations are modelled on the Chinese pipa
 Wolgeum (hangul: 월금; hanja: 月琴) – A lute with a moon-shaped wooden body, four strings, and 13 frets; no longer used
 Eoeungeum (hangul: 어은금) – A pear-shaped lute with five strings similar to hyangbipa; used only in North Korea

Bowed

Fiddles 

 Haegeum (hangul: 해금; hanja: 奚琴) – A vertical fiddle with two strings; derived from the ancient Chinese xiqin
 Sohaegeum (hangul: 소해금; hanja: 小奚琴) – A modernized fiddle with four strings similar to a modern violin; used only in North Korea
 Junghaegeum (hangul: 중해금; hanja: 中奚琴) - A modernized fiddle with four strings similar to a modern viola; used only in North Korea
 Daehaegeum (hangul: 대해금; hanja: 大奚琴) - A modernized fiddle with four strings similar to a modern cello; used only in North Korea
 Jeohaegeum (hangul: 저해금; hanja: 低奚琴) - A modernized fiddle with four strings similar to a modern double bass; used only in North Korea

Zithers 

 Ajaeng (hangul: 아쟁; hanja: 牙箏) – A zither bowed with a wooden stick, derived from the Chinese yazheng

Struck

 Yanggeum (hangul: 양금; hanja: 洋琴) – A hammered dulcimer with metal strings, struck with bamboo mallets; derived from the Chinese yangqin

Wind

Flutes

Transverse 

Daegeum (hangul: 대금; hanja: 大笒) – A large transverse bamboo flute with six finger-holes and an additional hole covered by a buzzing membrane
Junggeum (hangul: 중금; hanja 中笒) – A medium-sized transverse bamboo flute with six finger-holes, without a buzzing membrane; rarely used today
Sogeum (hangul: 소금; hanja: 小琴 or 小笒) – A small transverse bamboo flute with six finger-holes, without a buzzing membrane
Dangjeok (hangul: 당적; hanja: 唐笛) – A small transverse bamboo flute of Tang Chinese origin, slightly smaller than the junggeum
Ji (hangul: 지; hanja: 篪) – An ancient transverse bamboo flute with a protruding notched blowhole and five finger holes (one in the back and four in the front), derived from the Chinese chí. Used only in aak and Munmyo jeryeak (Korean Confucian ritual music)

End-blown

Danso (hangul: 단소; hanja: 短簫) – A small notched vertical bamboo flute with four finger-holes
Tungso (hangul: 퉁소; hanja: 洞簫) – A long notched vertical bamboo flute with five finger-holes; originally called tongso
Yak (hangul: 약; hanja: 籥) – A notched vertical bamboo flute with three finger-holes; used in Munmyo jeryeak (Korean Confucian ritual music)
Jeok (hangul: 적; hanja: 篴)
So (hangul: 소; hanja: 簫) – A pan flute; derived from the Chinese paixiao; used only in Munmyo jeryeak (Korean Confucian ritual music

Hun (hangul: 훈; hanja: 塤) – A globular flute made of baked clay originating from prehistoric times; end-blown like a shakuhachi, unlike an ocarina (which is a whistle design). Derived from the Chinese xun

Oboes

Piri (hangul: 피리) – A cylindrical oboe with a bamboo body. There are four varieties of piri:
Hyang piri (hangul: 향피리; hanja: —)
Se piri (hangul: 세피리; hanja: —)
Dang piri (hangul: 당피리; hanja: —)
Dae piri (hangul: 대피리) – A modernised instrument with clarinet-like keys, used only in North Korea
Taepyeongso (hangul: 태평소; hanja: 太平簫; also called hojeok, saenap or nallari) – A conical oboe with a wooden body and metal bell

Free-reed

Saenghwang – A free-reed mouth organ with 17 bamboo pipes, derived from the Chinese sheng; uncommon today

Trumpets

Nabal (hangul: 나발;) – Long metal trumpet; used in daechwita
Nagak (hangul: 나각;) – Sea shell horn, also called sora; used in daechwita

Percussion
Jong (hangul: 종;) – A bronze bell
Pyeonjong (hangul: 편종;) – A set of 16 tuned bronze bells used in ancient court music; derived from the Chinese bianzhong
Teukgjong (hangul: 특종;) – A single large bronze bell
Pyeongyeong (hangul: 편경;) – A set of 16 tuned stone chimes used in ancient court music; derived from the Chinese bianqing
Teukgyeong (hangul: 특경;) – A single large tuned stone chime
Banghyang (hangul: 방향;) – A metallophone with 16 tuned iron slabs; derived from the Chinese fangxiang
Ulla (hangul: 운라; hanja:  or ) – A set of ten small tuned gongs in a wooden frame; derived from the Chinese yunluo

Drums
Buk (hangul: 북) – A barrel drum used primarily in pansori, pungmul, and samulnori. The term buk is also used in Korean as a generic term to refer to any type of drum.
Pungmul-buk(풍물북) – used in pungmul (풍물)
Sori-buk (소리북) – used to accompany pansori (판소리)

Janggu or Janggo (hangul: 장구 or 장고; hanja: 杖鼓 or 長鼓) – A double-headed hourglass-shaped drum generally played with one stick and one hand

Galgo (hangul: 갈고; hanja: 羯鼓) – Double-headed hourglass-shaped drum similar to the janggo but played with two sticks and thinner drum heads; sometimes called yanggo or yangjanggo; no longer commonly used 
Jingo (hangul: 진고; : 晉鼓) – Largest barrel drum
Jeolgo (hangul: 절고;) – Barrel drum
Jwago (hangul: 좌고;) – A barrel drum in a wooden frame
Geongo (hangul: 건고;) – Huge barrel drum
Yonggo (hangul: 용고;) – A barrel drum with a dragon painted on its shell; used in daechwitaEunggo (hangul: 응고;) – Barrel drum suspended from a frame
Sakgo – (hangul: 삭고;) – A long barrel drum suspended from a wooden frame
Gyobanggo (hangul: 교방고;) – Flat drum suspended from a frame
Junggo (hangul: 중고;) – Flat drum suspended from a frame; similar to the gyobanggo but larger
Sogo (hangul: 소고;) – A small hand-held drum
Nogo (hangul: 노고;) – A set of two drums pierced by a pole
Nodo (hangul: 노도;) – A set of two small drums on a pole, which is twisted to play; used in ritual music
Yeongdo (hangul: 영도; hanja:) – Four drums on a pole, which is twisted to play; used in ritual music
Noedo (hangul: 뇌도;)) – six small drums hung in a frame; used in ritual music
Noego (hangul: 뇌고;) – Three small barrel drums on a pole, which is twisted to play; used in ritual music
Do (도) – single pellet drum on a pole

Gongs
Kkwaenggwari (hangul: 꽹과리) – A small gong used primarily in folk music
Jing (hangul: 징) – A large gong; originally pronounced jeong (정; hanja: 鉦)

Cymbals
Jabara (hangul: 자바라; also called bara, bal, or jegeum) – pair of large brass cymbals, The name Zabara comes from Calpara.

Wooden instruments
Bak (hangul: 박;) – A wooden clapper; used in ancient court and ritual music
Chuk (hangul: 축;) – A wooden box, played by hitting a stick on the inside, used to mark beats or sections; derived from the Chinese zhù; used in ancient ritual music
Eo (hangul: 어;) – A wooden percussion instrument carved in the shape of a tiger with a serrated back, played by running a bamboo whisk across it to mark the ends of sections; derived from the Chinese yǔClay instruments
Bu (hangul: 부;) – A clay pot, derived from the Chinese fǒu; used in Munmyo jeryeak''

See also

Akhak Gwebeom
Korean music
String instruments

References

External links
Korean string instruments
Korean bamboo wind instruments
Korean drums
Korean wind instruments
Korean percussion instruments
Korean string instruments
North Korean instruments

Listening
Korean instrument audio samples
Korean music audio from Robert Garfias site

Video
Korean instruments videos from Robert Garfias site

 
Instruments
South Korean folk music